James, Jim, or Jimmy Harrison may refer to:

In art, literature, and music
 James Harrison (actor) (1891–1986), American film actor
 James Harrison (author and academic) (born 1974), British academic author and Green Party politician
 James C. Harrison (1925–1990), American artist
 Jim Harrison (artist and writer) (1936–2016), American artist and writer
 Jim Harrison (1937–2016), American author
 Jimmy Harrison (1900–1931), American jazz trombonist

In politics
 James Harrison (Australian governor) (1912–1971), Governor of South Australia
 James Harrison (British Army officer) (1880–1957), former Lieutenant Governor of Jersey
 James Harrison (engineer) (1816–1893), Australian newspaper editor, politician and engineer
 James Harrison (Labour politician) (1899–1959), British Labour Member of Parliament
 James Fortescue Harrison (1819–?), Scottish Member of Parliament, 1874–1880
 James Harwood Harrison (1907–1980), British Conservative Member of Parliament
 J. Henry Harrison (1878–1943), New Jersey State Senator
 James T. Harrison (1903–1982), Justice of the Montana Supreme Court
 James Thomas Harrison (1811–1879), American politician and signatory of the Confederate States Constitution
 Jim Harrison (Australian politician) (1903–1976), Australian Labor politician
 Jim Harrison (South Carolina politician) (born 1951), South Carolina Republican politician

In sports
 James Harrison (American football) (born 1978), American football player
 James Harrison (footballer, born 1914), English football winger
 James Harrison (rugby league) (born 1996), rugby league player
 Jim Harrison (American football) (born 1948), American football player
 Jim Harrison (cricketer) (born 1941), Irish cricketer 
 Jim Harrison (ice hockey) (born 1947), Canadian ice hockey player
 Jimmy Harrison (footballer) (1921–2004), English footballer

Other persons
 James Harrison (architect) (1814–1866), English architect
 James Harrison (blood donor) (born 1936), blood donor who has saved two million children through his blood
 James Harrison (engineer), (1816–1893) Scottish Australian newspaper printer, journalist, politician, and pioneer in the field of mechanical refrigeration.
 James Harrison (priest) (died 1602), English Roman Catholic priest
 James E. Harrison (1815–1875), Confederate States Army brigadier general
 James M. Harrison (1915–1990), Canadian scientist and public servant
 James Maurice Harrison (1892–1971), British physician and ornithologist

See also
 Jaime Harrison (born 1975/76), American political operative
 Jamie Harrison (born 1990), English cricketer

References